Caged is an American reality television series which aired on MTV. It focuses on a group of young up and coming mixed martial arts fighters in small town Minden, Louisiana. The series premiered on January 9, 2012 on MTV and ran for 10 episodes on its first and only season.

Cast
 Wes Branch (Amateur 3-2)
 Tony "Primetime" Kelley (7-2)
 Daniel Payne (Amateur 6-3)
 Matt "Danger" Schnell (9-2)

Episodes

Impact of the show
Although the show is typically panned by MMA fans, it catapulted "Danger" (Matt Schnell) to the professional ranks after being discovered by Tito Ortiz. In November 2012, he won his professional debut against fellow newcomer Ryan Hollis by a split decision, and now fights in the UFC.

Tony Kelley made his professional debut in April 2013 winning by first round TKO against Kody Thrasher.

Critical reception
From Ken Tucker of Entertainment Weekly:

From Lucas High of TVGEEKARMY:

From Stephen Boyle of Sports Illustrated:

From Josh Nason of Bloody Elbow:

From Eric Ball of The Bleacher Report:

References

External links
 

2012 American television series debuts
2010s American reality television series
2012 American television series endings
Mixed martial arts television shows
Minden, Louisiana
MTV original programming
Television shows set in Louisiana